The Marlboro Cup was an international soccer tournament which ran on an irregular basis from 1987 to 1990 in the United States.  Sponsored by the Philip Morris company to promote its Marlboro brand of cigarettes, the tournament featured both top club as well as national teams.

List of champions

Men's tournament

See also
1988 Marlboro Cup (Los Angeles)

External links
 Marlboro Cups (USA) 1987–1990

Sources
History
Miami Cup

References

International association football competitions hosted by the United States

Defunct international association football competitions in North America
American soccer friendly trophies